James Douglas Rutherford McConnell (14 October 1915 – 29 April 1988) who used the pen-name Douglas Rutherford was a language teacher and an author.

Biography 
Born in Kilkenny, Ireland . He went to school in Yorkshire, studied at Clare College, Cambridge graduating in 1937, and received his MA from the University of Reading. During the Second World War, he served in the British Army Intelligence Corps in North Africa and Italy. After demobilisation, he became a modern languages teacher at Eton College from 1946 until his retirement in 1973.

Writing on weekends and holidays, he published his first novel, Comes the Blind Fury, in 1950. Many of his works centered on race-tracks or sports cars. With Francis Durbridge, he co-authored two novels in the Paul Temple series: The Tyler Mystery in 1957 and East of Algiers in 1959. Under the name James McConnell, he published books on learning foreign languages and on Eton.

He joined the Detection Club in 1970.

He married, in 1939, Margaret Worsley 'Peggy' Gandy (1910–1952) - daughter of Surg.-Cdr. Eric Worsley Gandy OBE; and secondly in 1953, Laura Margaret Goodwin (1922–2001).

Works

Novels

Series: Paddy Regan 
Comes the Blind Fury, 1950
Meet a Body, 1951
Telling of Murder, 1952 (alternative title Flight into Peril)

Series: Paul Temple (with Francis Durbridge) 
The Tyler Mystery, 1957
East of Algiers, 1959

Other novels 
The Chequered Flag, 1956
Grand Prix Murder, 1955
The Perilous Sky, 1956
The Long Echo, 1957
A Shriek of Tyres, 1958 (US title On the Track of Death, 1959)
Murder Is Incidental, 1961
The Creeping Flesh, 1963
Best Motor Racing Stories, 1965 (ed.)
The Black Leather Murders, 1966
Skin for Skin, 1968
The Gilt-edged Cockpit, 1969
Clear the Fast Lane, 1971
Kick Start, 1973
Killer on the Track, 1973
The Gunshot Grand Prix, 1972
Rally to the Death, 1974
Race Against the Sun, 1975
Mystery Tour, 1975
Return Load, 1977
Collision Course, 1978
Turbo, 1980
The Benedictine Commando, 1980 
Porcupine Basin, 1981
Stop at Nothing, 1983
Battlefield Madonna, 1985
A Game of Sudden Death, 1987

Short story 
 The Last Bullet, 1951
 Assignment in San Sebastian, (Pocket Book Weekly 23 Apr 1955)
 End of an Epoch in 'Omnibus of Speed' (Putnam 1958)
 Best Underworld Stories (ed) (Faber & Faber 1969)

Non-fiction Books 
Written as James McConnell or J. D. R. McConnell

Learn Italian Quickly, 1960
Learn Spanish Quickly, 1961
Learn French Quickly, 1966
Eton: How It Works, 1967
Eton Repointed: The New Structures of an Ancient Foundation, 1970 with photographs by Ray Williams
Treasures of Eton, 1976 (ed.)
Early Learning Foundation, 1979
English Public Schools, 1985

Sources 
 .
 .
 .

References

External links 
 Bibliographie
 Biographie et bibliographie

1915 births
Alumni of Clare College, Cambridge
Alumni of the University of Reading
British Army personnel of World War II
English mystery writers
Irish mystery writers
Irish male novelists
Irish schoolteachers
1988 deaths